Barea is a genus of moths of the family Oecophoridae. The genus was erected by Francis Walker in 1864.

All described species are found in Australia, Tasmania and New Zealand.

Species

References

External links
Oecophorinae subfamily at Australian Faunal Directory

Oecophoridae
Taxa named by Francis Walker (entomologist)